Centralia High School is a public secondary school in Centralia, Missouri. It is operated by the Centralia R-6 School District.

Notable alumni
Cheryl Burnett

References

External links
Official site

Centralia, Missouri
Public high schools in Missouri
High schools in Boone County, Missouri